St. Richard's Church is a Gothic Revival former Catholic church located in Columbia Falls, Montana, United States, in the Diocese of Helena.

St. Richard's was the first church in Northwestern Montana upon its completion in 1891. The clay used to make the bricks was sourced from the banks of the nearby Flathead River.

The building served as Columbia Falls' first public school during the weekdays. After World War II the parish outgrew the church and moved to a larger building. The building was added to the National Register of Historic Places in 1980.

Today the building is privately owned.

See also 

 Columbia Falls, Montana
 National Register of Historic Places in Flathead County

References 

Roman Catholic churches in Montana
National Register of Historic Places in Flathead County, Montana
Churches on the National Register of Historic Places in Montana
1891 establishments in Montana
Roman Catholic churches completed in 1891
Roman Catholic Diocese of Helena